21B may refer to:

 2-1B, a droid character in Star Wars
 Boron-21 (B-21 or 21B), an isotope of boron

See also
 B21 (disambiguation)